Michael George Rogodzinski (born February 22, 1948) is an American former Major League Baseball (MLB) outfielder who played for the Philadelphia Phillies from  to .

Biography
A native of Evanston, Illinois, Rogodzinski attended Evanston Township High School and Southern Illinois University, and in 1969 he played collegiate summer baseball with the Orleans Cardinals of the Cape Cod Baseball League. He was selected by the Philadelphia Phillies in the 2nd round (30th overall) of the 1969 MLB Draft.

References

External links

1948 births
Living people
Baseball players from Illinois
Philadelphia Phillies players
Major League Baseball outfielders
Southern Illinois Salukis baseball players
Orleans Firebirds players
Reading Phillies players
Eugene Emeralds players
Toledo Mud Hens players
Sportspeople from Evanston, Illinois
Evanston Township High School alumni